Juan José Bernales Segura (born 8 April 1981) is a Chilean former professional footballer who played as an attacking midfielder and mainly developed his career in Andorra.

Club career
Born in San Felipe, Chile, Bernales played for club Valle del Elqui from Vicuña in his country of birth.

He emigrated to Europe and developed his career in Andorra. In the top level, he played for both UE Sant Julià, coinciding with his compatriot Guillermo Burgos, and UE Engordany, coinciding with his compatriot Rodrigo Basualto. As a member of Sant Julià, he took part in the 2008-09 UEFA Cup and the 2009–10 UEFA Champions League.

In 2015, he joined Inter d'Escaldes after they were relegated to the second level by first time in their history and took part of the team reorganization. He stayed with them until 2018 and his last appearance was in January.

Personal life
He attended the Johan Cruyff Institute and got a degree in sport management. At the same time, he managed a hotel dining room.

Honours
UE Sant Julià
 Copa Constitució (1): 2011
 Andorran Supercup (1): 2011

References

External links
 
 
 Juan José Bernales at LaPreferente.com 
 Juan José Bernales at BDFutbol.com 

1981 births
Living people
People from San Felipe, Chile
Chilean footballers
Chilean expatriate footballers
Tercera División de Chile players
Primera Divisió players
UE Sant Julià players
UE Engordany players
Inter Club d'Escaldes players
Chilean expatriate sportspeople in Andorra
Expatriate footballers in Andorra
Association football midfielders